Network provider may refer to:
 Communications service provider, general term for service providers which transport information electronically
 Internet service provider
 Network service provider, which provides direct Internet backbone access to internet service providers
 Wireless service provider

See also 
 Network (disambiguation)